D. Rajarathinam was an Indian politician and former Member of the Legislative Assembly of Tamil Nadu. He was elected to the Tamil Nadu Legislative Assembly from Sriperumbudur Constituency as a Dravida Munnetra Kazhagam candidate in 1967 and 1971 elections. He was elected from Poonamallee Constituency as a Dravida Munnetra Kazhagam candidate in 1977 and 1980 elections.

References 

Dravida Munnetra Kazhagam politicians
Living people
Year of birth missing (living people)
Tamil Nadu MLAs 1967–1972
Tamil Nadu MLAs 1971–1976
Tamil Nadu MLAs 1977–1980
Tamil Nadu MLAs 1980–1984